The Morris Major is an automobile produced by Morris Motors in the United Kingdom from late 1930 until 1933. It was described by commentators as a Morris Oxford Six with a coachbuilt saloon body. 4025 examples of the 1931 model were produced followed by 14,469 of the 1932-33 model.

15 horsepower
Announced 30 August 1930 this new car was offered in two types of saloon and a coupé.
Range:
 Salonette, 4-passengers, black fabric £215
 Coach-built saloon 5-passengers with folding head £225
 Coach-built coupé with folding head £220
The engine was similar to that of the Morris Oxford Six as was the chassis. The nominally  2-litre engine was said to generate  at 3 200 rpm. The gearbox provided three forward speeds. The car was fitted with six brakes, the four-wheel ones adjustable by a single winged-nut.

14 horsepower
The Morris Major programme reported for the October 1931 Motor Show was:
Range of five types:
 Chassis £160
 Tourer £210
 Sports coupé £245
 Saloon fixed or sliding head £199.10.0 or £215
The fiscal horsepower had been dropped to 13.9 from 14.9. To achieve this the engine capacity was trimmed by a reduction of 2.25 mm in the bore so that bore and stroke became 61.25 x 102 mm giving a cubic capacity of 1803 cc. This reduced size six-cylinder engine had a four-bearing crankshaft an air-cleaner-heater and a fume-consumer head. Other standard features now included chrome finished automatic radiator shutters, a 4-speed twin-top gearbox, Lockheed hydraulic brakes and a wide 52-inch track.

Special coupé
The range was extended during 1932 with a Special coupé priced at £285.

References

External links

 Morris Cars - Major 1931-33, www.moreg.org.au

Major (1931 to 1933)
Cars introduced in 1930